The 2015–16 season is Bolton Wanderers's fourth consecutive season in the Football League Championship following their relegation from the Premier League in 2012. Along with the Championship, the club will also compete in the FA Cup and Football League Cup. The season covers the period from 1 July 2015 to 30 June 2016.

Pre-season

On 19 May 2015, Bolton Wanderers announced their pre-season schedule in full for both the entire squad and an XI squad. On 2 June 2015, the club confirmed their home pre-season friendly against ChievoVerona. On 26 June 2015, Bolton Wanderers announced the club will face two friendlies during their Austria tour. Bolton were set to play against Italian team A.C. ChievoVerona, however Chievo cancelled friendlies against both Bolton and Charlton Athletic, who also were set to play against them, which lead to the two teams playing against each other instead.

Mid-season friendlies

Competitions

Football League Championship

Matches
On 17 June 2015, the fixtures for the forthcoming season were announced.

League table

FA Cup

League Cup

Mid-season friendlies

Transfers

Transfers in

Transfers out

Total income:  £1,525,000

Loans in

Loans out

Squad

Statistics

|-
|colspan=14|Players out on loan:

|-
|colspan=14|Players who left the club during the season:

|}

Goals record

Disciplinary record

See also
List of Bolton Wanderers F.C. seasons

References

Bolton Wanderers F.C. seasons
Bolton Wanderers